Bathystyeloides is a genus of ascidian tunicates in the family Styelidae.

Species within the genus Bathystyeloides include:
 Bathystyeloides anfractus Monniot & Monniot, 1985 
 Bathystyeloides dubius C. & F. Monniot, 1984 
 Bathystyeloides enderbyanus (Michaelsen, 1904) 
 Bathystyeloides laubieri Monniot C. & Monniot F., 1974 
 Bathystyeloides magnus Sanamyan & Sanamyan, 1999 
 Bathystyeloides mexicanus Monniot & Monniot, 1987 
 Bathystyeloides miriducta Monniot & Monniot, 1991

Species names currently considered to be synonyms:
 Bathystyeloides atlantica Millar, 1955: synonym of Bathystyeloides enderbyanus (Michaelsen, 1904)

References

Stolidobranchia
Tunicate genera